Richard Small may refer to:
 Richard Small (horse trainer) (1945–2014), American horse racing trainer
 Richard H. Small (born 1935), American scientist in the field of electroacoustics
 Richard Small (cricketer) (born 1938), New Zealand cricketer